Pilomecyna griseolineata is a species of beetle in the family Cerambycidae. It was described by Breuning in 1957.

Subspecies
 Pilomecyna griseolineata griseolineata Breuning, 1957
 Pilomecyna griseolineata uniformis Breuning, 1957

References

Desmiphorini
Beetles described in 1957